Raymond Richard Patterson (December 14, 1929 - April 5, 2001) was an American poet, opera librettist, and educator.

Biography 

Born in Harlem, Raymond Patterson moved to Long Island with his family as a teenager and remained in the New York area most of his life.

Patterson received a B.A. from Lincoln University (Pennsylvania), M.A. in English from New York University in 1954.

Patterson taught English at Benedict College in South Carolina, in the New York City public schools, and at City University of New York, where he was a professor from  1968 until 1992.

He served as an executive board member of the Poetry Society of America, PEN American Center, and the Walt Whitman Birthplace.  In 1973, Patterson founded the Langston Hughes Festival at CUNY and served as its director until 1993.

Patterson wrote librettos for two operas by Hale Smith – David Walker and Goree – and his work was also featured in Three Patterson Lyrics, another composition by Hale Smith, which premiered at Alice Tully Hall in 1985.

Bibliography 

 The Dangerous River, Sloane, 1954
 Get Caught: a photographic essay, 1964 (with photography by Lawrence Sykes)
 26 Ways of Looking at a Black Man and Other Poems, Award Books, 1969
 Elemental Blues, Cross-Cultural Communications, 1983
 Elemental Bliss, Cross-Cultural Communications, 1989

References

External links 
 The Langston Hughes Festival at CUNY

1929 births
2001 deaths
20th-century African-American writers
20th-century American poets
African-American poets
American male poets
Writers from New York City
20th-century American male writers
African-American male writers